Urgench (//, ; ; , Gorgånch/Gorgānč/Gorgânc/Gurganj) is a district-level city in western Uzbekistan. It is the capital of Xorazm Region. The estimated population of Urgench in 2021 was 145,000, an increase from 139,100 in 1999. It lies on the Amu Darya River and the Shavat canal.
The history of the city goes back to the second half of the 19th century. The city should not be confused with the similarly-named city of Konye-Urgench (also known as "Old Urgench" or "Gurgench") in Turkmenistan. The city of Old Urgench was left after the Amu Darya river changed its course in the 16th century, leaving the old town without water. New Urgench was founded by Russians in the second half of the 19th century at the site of a little trade station of the Khanate of Khiva.

Modern Urgench is a Soviet-style city with cotton motifs adorning many objects, from street lights to apartment houses. Of note is a monument to the twenty Komsomol members killed by Tekke basmachi on the banks of the Syr Darya in 1922, and a large statue to Muhammad al-Khwarizmi, the 9th century local mathematician who revolutionised algebra, outside the Hotel Urgench.  Urgench is the main gateway for tourists to Khiva,  to the southeast, whose old city, known as Itchan Kala, is a UNESCO World Heritage Site.

The Polish singer Anna German was born in Urgench in 1936.

Climate

See also
Old Urgench: Konye-Urgench in north Turkmenistan
Trolleybuses in Urgench
Urgench International Airport

References

External links 
 

Populated places in Xorazm Region
Cities in Uzbekistan